Giada Colagrande (born 16 October 1975) is an Italian film director and actress. She is the wife of American actor Willem Dafoe.

Life and career
In 2005 Colagrande directed her second feature, Before it Had a Name, which she co-wrote and co-starred in with Willem Dafoe. The two had met on the set of Wes Anderson's film The Life Aquatic With Steve Zissou.

In 2012, she made The Woman Dress and completed the feature-length film Bob Wilson's Life & Death of Marina Abramovic.

In 2016 Colagrande wrote, directed and performed in PADRE, starring Franco Battiato, Willem Dafoe and Marina Abramović.

As an actress, Colagrande has also performed in Abel Ferrara's Pasolini (2014).

Personal life
Colagrande has been married to actor Willem Dafoe since 2005. She has one stepson from Dafoe's previous relationship.

Filmography
Aprimi il cuore (Open My Heart) (2002)
Before It Had a Name (2005)
A Woman (2010)
Bob Wilson's Life & Death of Marina Abramović (2012)
The Abramovic Method (2013)
Castello Cavalcanti (2013)
Pasolini (2014)
PADRE  (2016)

References

External links
 

1975 births
Living people
People from Pescara
Italian women film directors
Italian film actresses
Italian film directors
Italian film producers
Italian screenwriters
People of Abruzzese descent
Italian women screenwriters